is a 2012 Japanese anime film directed by Tetsurō Amino and set in the Macross universe.

Plot
Macross FB7 is a movie adaptation of Macross 7, using the framing device of the main cast of Macross Frontier studying the mysterious lack of new songs from Fire Bomber in over a decade, via a set of tapes that are delivered through mysterious means.

Voice cast
Katsuyuki Konishi as Ozma Lee
Megumi Nakajima as Ranka Lee
Aya Endo as Sheryl Nome
May'n as Sheryl Nome (singing voice)
Kenta Miyake as Bobby Margot
Jun Fukuyama as Luca Angeloni
Hiroshi Kamiya as Mikhail Blanc
Megumi Toyoguchi as Klan Klang
Houko Kuwashima as Canaria Berstein
Akio Suyama as Gavil

International release

Due to a current legal dispute over the distribution rights of the Macross franchise, involving Studio Nue and Big West against Harmony Gold, much of the Macross merchandise post 1999, including Macross FB 7, have not received an international release.

However, on 1 March 2021, Big West, Studio Nue and Harmony Gold reached an agreement on the international distribution of most Macross sequels and films.

References

External links
Archive of Official website 

2012 anime films
Crossover anime and manga
Animated films based on animated series
Films set in 2059
Satelight
Macross anime and manga
Japanese animated films